Santiago Metropolitan Cathedral is the seat of the Archbishop of Santiago de Chile, currently Celestino Aós Braco, and the center of the Archdiocese of Santiago de Chile. Construction of the Neoclassical cathedral began in 1753 and ended in 1799. The architect was the Italian Gioacchino Toesca. Further alterations ordered at the end of the 19th century gave it its present appearance. Previous cathedrals in the archdiocese had been destroyed by earthquakes.

The cathedral, located in the city's historic center, faces the northwest corner of Santiago's Plaza de Armas and stands near the Palacio Arzobispal de Santiago, the administrative center for the archdiocese. The cathedral is also close to the Parroquia El Sagrario, a Catholic church and a Chilean national monument.

Santiago Metropolitan Cathedral is of a Baroque style, with many ornaments, frescos, and gilded columns. The two towers of the cathedral were added almost a whole century later, showing layers of history in its architecture.

The cathedral, built over 220 years ago, did not have the kind of technology or considerations that modern buildings today have, particularly regarding earthquakes. Since Chile is on the Atacama fault line, it experiences quite a lot of earthquakes. Large masonry buildings like the Metropolitan Cathedral were not built with earthquake considerations, and since masonry has low tensile strength the building has suffered damage and destruction. Due to the destruction and rebuilding/remodeling, the cathedral became a national historic monument in 1951.

Because of the earthquake damage, tests were done to the structure of the building to see if any structural updates were necessary, which there were. Tests were required to carry out any sort of renovations or updates to the cathedral.

References

External links 

 Website for the Cathedral

Roman Catholic churches completed in 1800
Churches in Santiago, Chile
Roman Catholic cathedrals in Chile
1800 establishments in the Captaincy General of Chile
19th-century Roman Catholic church buildings in Chile
Neoclassical church buildings in Chile